Åse Nygård  is a Norwegian handball player. She played 76 matches and scored 96 goals for the Norwegian national team between 1978 and 1984.  She participated at the 1982 World Women's Handball Championship, where the Norwegian team placed seventh.

References

Year of birth missing (living people)
Living people
Norwegian female handball players
20th-century Norwegian women